On the London Underground, fluffer  is the name given to a person employed to clean the tracks in the tunnels.
The passage of the trains through the tunnels draws in dust and rubbish. Removing this debris is essential to maintain the safety of the Underground, as it would otherwise create a fire hazard.

The work is done at night during Engineering Hours, when the trains have finished running, and the electricity is switched off. Cleaning the tunnels is a heavy and dirty job, which has traditionally been a role carried out by teams of women.  In 1947, a newsreel made by British Pathé captured the fluffers on film carrying carbide lamps, long brushes and scraping tools. The rubbish was removed in dustbins, loaded onto a trolley that was drawn along the rails.

In 1989, documentary filmmaker Molly Dineen chronicled the work of a team of fluffers at Angel station in Islington for a TV documentary called The Heart of the Angel.

These days, the fluffers have electric torches and protective clothing, and collect the dust in plastic bags. Fluffer teams still tend to be mainly made up of women.

References 

London Underground
Cleaning and maintenance occupations